Live at the Athenaeum is the fourth live album by Australian musician Renée Geyer. The album was recorded at the Melbourne Athenaeum on 1 November 2003, during her Tenderland tour. 
The album was released in April 2004 and included as a bonus disc on a special edition of the album, Tenderland.

"Really Really Love You" and "Thieves in the Temple" received airplay on Triple J in August 2004.

Track listing
 "Really, Really Love You" (Renée Geyer Band) – 5:46
 "Thieves in the Temple" (Prince) – 4:45
 "Morning Glory" (Bobbie Gentry) – 4:30
 "Midnight Train to Georgia" (Jim Weatherly) – 5:42
 "Peace and Understanding" – 10:07
 "Nasty Streak" (Dan Kelly) – 7:27
 "Killer Lover" (Paul Kelly) – 6:01
 "Close to You" (Burt Bacharach, Hal David) – 4:57
 "Love Don't Live Here Anymore (Miles Gregory) –  9:08
 "It's a Man's Man's Man's World" (James Brown, Betty Jean Newsome) – 9:06
 "Sitting in Limbo" (Guilly Bright, Jimmy Cliff) – 6:40
 "Heading in the Right Direction" (Garry Paige, Mark Punch) – 5:27

Release history

References

Renée Geyer albums
2004 live albums
Live albums by Australian artists
Mushroom Records live albums